The Turner House is a 2015 debut novel by Angela Flournoy. The novel was shortlisted for the National Book Award for Fiction and later won the VCU First Novelist Award.

Background 
Though Flournoy's father's family is originally from Detroit, she had not lived in the city, so did considerable research to be able to depict the different 20th century periods of life in Detroit depicted in the novel.

Plot 
The novel tells the story of a Detroit family with 13 children as it responds to the economic woes of the city, in both the 1940s, and then in 2008. The house that sees the changes in the family, also becomes a character in the family's saga.

Style

Flournoy gives considerable tribute to Zora Neale Hurston as an inspiration for her work, and reviewers made comparison of the novel to works like Hurston's Mules and Men.

Reception 
The novel received strong positive reviews. Kirkus Reviews wrote that "Flournoy’s writing is precise and sharp, and despite several loose ends [...] the novel draws readers to the Turner family almost magnetically." The Nation reviewer Hannah K. Gold focused on how the novel successfully explores the dispossessed African American family, and praises the novel writing that it is "a story transformed by intragenerational retelling rather than passed down. It’s quick and dirty mythmaking." Writing at The New York Times, Matthew Thomas called The Turner House a "assured and memorable novel."

BuzzFeed reported that The Turner House enjoyed strong sales in addition to positive critical reception: "According to Bookscan, which tracks around 70% of U.S. book sales, her book has sold over 15,000 copies in paperback and hardcover as of April [2016]; anything over 10,000 is generally considered high for literary fiction."

Awards
 Finalist, 2015 National Book Award for Fiction
 Winner, 2016 VCU Cabell First Novelist Award

References

External links
 The Turner House at www.angelaflournoy.com

2015 American novels
Novels set in Detroit
2015 debut novels
Houghton Mifflin books